Per-Olof Östrand (13 June 1930 – 26 October 1980) was a Swedish freestyle swimmer. He competed at the 1948, 1952 and 1956 Olympics in six 200–1500 m freestyle events in total, and won a bronze medal in the 400 m freestyle in 1952. His 4 × 200 m relay teams finished in fourth place in 1948 and 1952; they won gold medals at the European championships in 1947 and 1954.

Nationally Östrand won 15 swimming titles between 1947 and 1955, and competed in water polo for his club Hofors AIF. He won the 1949 British 'Open' ASA National Championship 220 yards freestyle title  and he won the 1949 ASA National Championship 440 yards freestyle title.

References

1930 births
1980 deaths
Swedish male freestyle swimmers
Olympic swimmers of Sweden
Swimmers at the 1948 Summer Olympics
Swimmers at the 1952 Summer Olympics
Swimmers at the 1956 Summer Olympics
Olympic bronze medalists for Sweden
World record setters in swimming
Olympic bronze medalists in swimming
European Aquatics Championships medalists in swimming
Medalists at the 1952 Summer Olympics